Joshua Rashaad McFadden is an American visual artist whose primary medium is photography. McFadden explores the use of archival material within his work and is known for his portraiture. He also conceptually investigates themes related to identity, masculinity, history, race, and sexuality.

Biography 
Born in Rochester, New York, a city known for photography, McFadden was raised by his mother and father and has three brothers.  McFadden obtained a bachelor's degree in fine art from Elizabeth City State University, a Historically Black University (HBCU) in North Carolina, where he took his first class in black and white photography.

Education 
McFadden holds a BA in Fine Art from Elizabeth City State University, and a Master of Fine Art (MFA) in photography from Savannah College of Art and Design.

Career 
Joshua Rashaad McFadden is an Assistant Professor of Photography at Rochester Institute of Technology (RIT) in the School of Photographic Arts and Sciences - College of Art and Design.

References

External links 

Living people
21st-century American photographers
Savannah College of Art and Design alumni
Elizabeth City State University alumni
Artists from Rochester, New York
African-American contemporary artists
American contemporary artists
Year of birth missing (living people)
21st-century African-American artists